Elektromreža Srbije (abbr. EMS) is a Serbian national transmission system operator company with the headquarters in Belgrade, Serbia.

It was founded in 2005 after being split from Elektroprivreda Srbije and it is specialized in the transmission of electrical power. It is a member of the European Network of Transmission System Operators for Electricity.

History
On 1 July 2005, the electric power transmission division of Elektroprivreda Srbije was split from the company and established its own public enterprise subsidiary Elektromreža Srbije (EMS).

In November 2016, Elektromreža Srbije changed its legal form to joint-stock company with 100% of shares being owned by the Government of Serbia.

In March 2018, the European electricity transmission association ENTSO-E warned over delay of electric clocks throughout Europe's power network due to lower frequency which was caused by the loss of electricity in the network. Namely, the loss was created due to political dispute between Serbia and Kosovo where the Kosovar power transmission company KOSTT took 113 GWh unauthorizedly from the network in the period of January–February 2018. Elektromreža Srbije has legal jurisdiction over Kosovar electricity transmission network, but due to political dispute, does not exercise full control over it. The direct loss of 113 GWh would amount to 24.86 million euros, as per average euro area electricity price (per KWh) of 22 eurocents for households in 2017.

Market and financial data
As of 2017, EMS posted a profit of 25.51 million euros and had 208.45 million euros of revenues.

See also
 Elektroprivreda Srbije (EPS)
 Transmission system operator
 Electricity distribution companies by country
 European Network of Transmission System Operators for Electricity (ENTSO-E)

Notes and references
Notes

References

External links
 
 Overview of JP "Elektromreža Srbije" main activities aimed to improve power system control

Companies based in Belgrade
Electric power transmission system operators in Serbia
Elektroprivreda Srbije
Energy companies established in 2005
Government-owned companies of Serbia
Serbian companies established in 2005